MEMC may refer to:

 MEMC Electronic Materials, a United States manufacturer of silicon wafers for the semiconductor industry
 MEMC, a support chip in Acorn Computers
 mEMC, mammalian endoplasmic reticulum membrane protein complex
 Motion estimation/motion compensation; see 
 Mount Elizabeth Medical Centre, in Singapore

See also
 Pro-Emancipation Movement of Chilean Women (MeMCh)